The Boys' 100 metres at the 2011 World Youth Championships in Athletics was held at the Stadium Nord Lille Métropole on 6 and 7 July. The event was won by Odail Todd of Jamaica, who was only drafted into the event after World Youth leader Jazeel Murphy was forced to withdraw due to injury. Odean Skeen, the 2010 Youth Olympic 100 m champion, also had to withdraw prior to the event.

Medalists

Records
Prior to the competition, the following records were as follows.

No new records were set during the competition.

Heats 
Qualification rule: first 2 of each heat (Q) plus the 4 fastest times (q) qualified.

Heat 1

Heat 2

Heat 3

Heat 4

Heat 5

Heat 6

Heat 7

Heat 8

Heat 9

Heat 10

Heat 11

Heat 12

Semifinals 
Qualification rule: first 2 of each heat (Q) plus the 2 fastest times (q) qualified.

Heat 1

Heat 2

Heat 3

Final

References 

2011 World Youth Championships in Athletics
100 metres at the IAAF World Youth Championships in Athletics